This list of Nebraska Cornhuskers academic honors and awards are the academic achievements of Nebraska Cornhuskers student-athletes. The university is a member of the Big Ten Conference, and the Cornhuskers compete in NCAA Division I, fielding 22 varsity teams (nine men's, thirteen women's) across fifteen sports. Nebraska student-athletes have won 315 Academic All-American awards and seventeen Today's Top 10 Awards, both more than any other university. They have also won fifteen Academic All-American of the Year awards.

Major awards

Today's Top 10 Award
Nebraska student-athletes have won seventeen Today's Top 10 Awards, more than any other school. The award honors student-athletes based upon the criteria of athletic achievement, academic achievement, and community involvement.

Academic All-American of the Year
The CoSIDA Academic All-American-of-the-Year award is given annually to the top student-athlete in each sport as voted on by the College Sports Information Directors of America. Ten Nebraska student-athletes have combined to win the award fifteen times.

Academic All-Americans
Nebraska student-athletes have been named Academic All-America selections 340 times across all sports, most among NCAA Division I universities. Nebraska's football program has produced 108 Academic All-Americans, most among FBS schools.

Academic All-Americans by sport

First team

Second team, third team, honorable mention

References

Nebraska Cornhuskers